Clathrina fjordica is a species of calcareous sponge from Chile. The species is named after Comau Fjord, the type locality.

Description
Cormus fragile, the holotype is 60 x 45 x 7 mm. It is composed of large, irregular and loosely anastomosed tubes. Water-collecting tubes are present. The skeleton has no special organisation, and it is composed of only one category of triactine varying from cylindrical to conical actines.

References

World Register of Marine Species entry

Clathrina
Animals described in 2009
Fauna of Chile